Football was contested at the 2015 Summer Universiade from July 2 to 13 in Gwangju, South Korea.

Medal summary

Medal table

Medal events

Men

Sixteen teams participated in the men's tournament.

Teams

Pool A

Pool B

Pool C

Pool D

Women

Fifteen teams participated in the women's tournament.

Teams

Pool A

Pool B

Pool C

Pool D

References

External links
Official Website

 
2015
Football
2015
2015 in association football
2015 in South Korean football